Mohammad or Muhammad Yousuf may refer to:

 Muhammad Yousuf Banuri, Pakistani Islamic Scholar
 Muhammad Yousuf Naqash
 Muhammad Yusuf Ludhianvi, Pakistani Islamic Scholar
 Muhammad Yusuf Kandhlawi, Indian Islamic Scholar
 Muhammad Yusuf Saraf, Pakistani Jurist
 Muhammad Yousaf (snooker player)
 Muhammad Yusuf Uthman, founder of Jund al-Aqsa
 Muhammad Yusuf Ali, Bangladeshi politician
 Muhammad Yusuf (poet)
 Muhammad Yousuf (politician), Pakistani politician
 Muhammad Yusuf Hashmi, Reformer and Leader of the Pakistan Movement
 Muhammad Yousaf Shahwani, Pakistani politician
 Mohammad Yousuf (cricketer), Pakistani cricket coach and former cricketer
 Muhammad Yusuf (footballer), Indonesian footballer